St Osmund's Church, Derby is a Grade II listed Church of England parish church in Derby, Derbyshire.

History

The foundation stone was laid on 6 August 1904. The architects were Percy Heylyn Currey  and Charles Clayton Thompson, and the contractor was Mr. R. Weston of Derby. It was built of Leicestershire brick, dressed with Matlock stone. It was consecrated by the Bishop of Southwell on 2 December 1905.

In 1971, St Andrew's Church, Derby was demolished and the two parishes were united.

Organ
A pipe organ was installed by Bishop and Son. This was replaced in 2013 by the 1875 organ by Hunter originally in Christ Church, Brixton Road, then Queen's Hall Methodist Church, Derby. A specification of the organ can be found on the National Pipe Organ Register.

See also
Listed buildings in Alvaston

References

Church of England church buildings in Derbyshire
Churches completed in 1905
Osmund
Grade II listed churches in Derbyshire
Osmund
1905 establishments in England